Höfe District is a district of the canton of Schwyz, Switzerland. The coat of arms of the Höfe is per pale: gules, two lions rampant contourny or; and or, three lions passant gules.

The district contains three municipalities:

References and external links 

 

Districts of the canton of Schwyz